The vast territory of Kazakhstan spans across . The population density is low in Kazakhstan, and the centers of industry and agriculture are spread out and remote from world markets.

Railways 

Railways provide 68% of all cargo and passenger traffic to over 57% of the country.

Kazakhstan Temir Zholy (KTZ) is the national railway company. KTZ cooperates with French loco manufacturer Alstom in developing Kazakhstan's railway infrastructure. Alstom has more than 600 staff and two joint ventures with KTZ and its subsidiary in Kazakhstan. In July 2017, Alstom opened its first locomotive repairing center in Kazakhstan. It is the only repairing center in Central Asia and the Caucasus.

As the Kazakhstani rail system was designed during the Soviet era, rail routes were designed ignoring inter-Soviet borders, based on the needs of Soviet planning. This has caused anomalies, such as the route from Oral to Aktobe passing briefly through Russian territory. It also means that routes might not suit modern-day Kazakhstani needs.

Kazakhstan's developed railway system promotes international and regional trade connecting Asia and Europe. In 2019, the transit of goods through Kazakhstan increased 23% to 664,000 containers.

Railway links with adjacent countries 

  Russia - same gauge (former Soviet Union railway system)
  China - break of gauge /; 
 Border station at Druzhba, KZ - Alashankou, CN, connection between the Turkestan–Siberia Railway and the Northern Xinjiang Railway (no electrification on them).
 Another connection exist from Altynkol railway station near Khorgas to the Jinghe–Yining–Khorgos Railway towards Ürümqi.
  Kyrgyzstan - same gauge (former Soviet Union railway system)
  Uzbekistan - same gauge (former Soviet Union railway system)
  Turkmenistan - same gauge (former Soviet Union railway system) (railway link opened in 2013, presently for freight)
 Caspian Sea - railhead 

In 2006, a standard gauge rail link from China to Europe was proposed.

In 2007, it was proposed to eliminate break of gauge at Druzhba-Alashankou by converting the Kazakhstan main line to European gauge.

In 2008, BOOT line from Zhetigen to Khorgos on the China border. The line would branch off the existing railway near Shaquanzi.

Maps 
 UN Map
 reliefweb map

Towns served by rail

Rapid transit and tram systems

Almaty 

There is a small metro system in Almaty, the former capital and the largest city in the country. Second and third metro lines are planned in the future. The second line would intersect with the first line at Alatau and Zhibek Zholy stations.

In May 2011, the construction of the second phase of the Almaty Metro line 1 began. The general contractor is Almatymetrokurylys. The extension includes five new stations, and will connect the downtown area of Almaty with Kalkaman in the suburbs. Its length will be .

The construction is divided into three phases. The first phase, the addition of the two stations Sairan and Moscow with a length of  opened in 2015.

There was a tram system of 10 lines which operated from 1937 to 2015.

Nur-Sultan 

A metro system is currently under construction in Nur-Sultan, the capital city.

The metro line had been a long time coming and the project was abandoned at one point in 2013, but an agreement was signed on 7 May 2015 for the project to go ahead.

Oskemen 

In Oskemen, a tram system was operated until 2018. Opened between 1959 and 1978, the tram was a popular form of transport in Oskemen/Ust-Kamenogorsk. At its peak, it had six routes, but in the end it had four routes in operation. It had a fleet of 50 working tram cars.

Pavlodar 

In Pavlodar, there is a  tram network which began service in 1965. , the network has 20 regular and three special routes. The network has a 60% share of the local public transport market. Its fleet of 115 trams are due to be replaced and in 2012, with the city announcing plans to purchase 100 new trams.

Temirtau 

There are two tram lines in Temirtau.

Highways 

It is, however, notable for containing the easterly terminus of European route E40, which contains the most easterly section of the Euroroute network.

 Total:  (2002)
 Paved:  (2002)
 Unpaved:  (2002)

, there were 3,845,301 registered cars and a total of 4,425,770 units of autotransport.

Five international routes pass through Kazakhstan, totaling . These highways are:
 M-36 Highway: Almaty – Nur-Sultan – Kostanay (continues to Chelyabinsk)
 Almaty – Petropavl to Omsk with the release of
 M-38 Highway: Almaty - Semey - Pavlodar (continues to Omsk)
 M-39 Highway: Almaty - Shymkent (continues to Tashkent)
 M-32 Highway: Shymkent - Aktobe - Oral (continues to Samara)

In 2009, the country began the construction of the "Western Europe - Western China" highway, which will be completed . The total length of the road will be , of which  will be in Kazakhstan (Aktobe, Kyzylorda, South Kazakhstan, Zhambyl and Almaty oblasts). The thickness of the asphalt and concrete pavement will be , and the expected lifespan of the highway will be 25 years, without a major overhaul, and the maximum speed limit . The project includes a number of bridges over rivers, road maintenance facilities, bus stop areas, avtopavilony, cattle trails, and electronic signage. Simultaneously with the construction of this highway, roads will be repaired and built in areas along its route.

Motorways
The motorway network in Kazakhstan is rather underdeveloped, mainly due to the low population density in the country, which doesn't require wider roads on long distances. There is a total of 490 km of motorways. The following are the only existing multi-lane, double carriage roads in Kazakhstan:
 A1 - Runs from Nur-Sultan to Shchuchinsk. It further continues as the A1 two-lane highway to Kokshetau. Motorway length: .
 A2 - Runs from Almaty to a point past Uzynagash. It further continues as the A2 two-lane highway to Shymkent. Motorway length: .
 A2 - Other four-lane portion runs from Shymkent to Zhibek Zholy, on the border with Uzbekistan. Length: .
 A3 - Runs from Almaty to Kapshagay. It further continues as the A3 two-lane highway to Oskemen. Motorway length: .

Pipelines  
As of 2010, pipelines in Kazakhstan consist of:

 Condensate: 
 Gas: 
 Oil: 
 Refined products: 
 Water,

Waterways and waterborne transportation 

Ports and harbors

Caspian Sea 
 Aqtau (Shevchenko) - railhead 
 Atyrau (Gur'yev) - railhead

On rivers 
 Oskemen (Ust-Kamenogorsk)
 Pavlodar
 Semey (Semipalatinsk)

Merchant Marine 
The merchant marine has a total of 119 vessels  consisting of four general cargo vessels, ten petroleum tankers, and 105 other vessels.

Airports 

Kazakhstan has a total of 97 airports. (2012) However, it is quoted as having a total of 449 airports in 2001.

The large area of the country and the associated long distances makes air travel a very important component in domestic travel.

Airports - with paved runways 

total: 64

 over : 10
 : 25
 : 16
 : 5
 under : 8 (2012)

Airports - with unpaved runways 
total: 33
 over : 5
 : 7
 : 3
 : 5
 under : 13 (2012)

Open Sky regime 
11 airports of Kazakhstan are part of the open sky regime, which allows more foreign carriers and more flights to operate at Kazakh airports. They include the airports of Nur-Sultan, Almaty, Shymkent, Aktau, Karaganda, Ust-Kamenogorsk, Pavlodar, Kokshetau, Taraz, Petropavlovsk, and Semey.

Heliports 
Total: 3 (2012)

Airlines 

The European Commission blacklisted all Kazakh carriers in 2009, with the sole exception of Air Astana. Since then, Kazakhstan had consistently been taking measures to modernize and revamp its air safety oversight. Thus, in 2016, the European Aviation Safety Agency removed all Kazakh airlines from its blacklist citing “sufficient evidence of compliance” with international standards by Kazakh airlines and its Civil Aviation Committee.

In December 2021, it was announced that Kazakhstan’s aviation safety record increased to 84%, which is 15% higher than the global average. These statistics were reported from an audit conducted by the ICAO Coordinated Validation Mission.

 Air Astana - Air Astana (Эйр Астана) is the principal airline and the flag carrier of the Republic of Kazakhstan, based in Almaty, Kazakhstan. It operates scheduled domestic and international services on 56 routes from its main hub, Almaty International Airport, and from its 2 secondary hubs, Astana International Airport and Atyrau Airport. It is a joint venture between Kazakhstan's sovereign wealth fund Samruk-Kazyna (51%), and BAE Systems PLC (49%). It was incorporated in October 2001, and started commercial flights on 15 May 2002. At the 2012 World Airline Awards held at Farnborough Airshow in the UK, Air Astana was named the Best Airline in Central Asia & India.
 FlyArystan - low-cost subsidiary of Air Astana
 SCAT Airlines
 Sunday Airlines - charter subsidiary of SCAT Airlines
 Qazaq Air
 Caspiy
 Kaz TransAir
 Sigma Airlines
 Sunkar Air

The New Silk Road
Kazakhstan is actively involved in the New Silk Road initiative, which is an infrastructure project expected to significantly accelerate and reduce the cost of goods delivery from China to Europe through Central Asia.

External links 

 Kazakhstan, South Korea to set up bus-assembling JV
 Air Astana website
 Kazakhstan Railways website in English
 Almaty airport details
 Official website for Astana Airport in English
 Unofficial website for Astana Airport in English

References